Admiral Barrett may refer to:

Danelle Barrett (born 1967), U.S. Navy rear admiral
Edward J. Barrett (born 1943), U.S. Coast Guard rear admiral
Tim Barrett (admiral) (born 1959), Royal Australian Navy vice admiral
Thomas J. Barrett (born 1947), U.S. Coast Guard vice admiral

See also
Edward Gabriel André Barrett (1827–1880), U.S. Navy commodore (admiral equivalent rank)